Moshe Landau (29 April 1912 – 1 May 2011) was an Israeli judge. He was the fifth President of the Supreme Court of Israel.

Biography
Landau was born in Danzig, Germany (modern Gdańsk, Poland) to Dr. Isaac Landau and Betty née Eisenstädt. His father was a leading member of the Jewish Community of Danzig 
In 1930 he finished high school in the Free City of Danzig and in 1933 he graduated from the University of London School of Law. That year, he immigrated to the British Mandate of Palestine. In 1937 he was admitted to the Bar of Palestine. In 1940 he was made judge in the Magistrate's Court of Haifa and was appointed to the District Court in 1948.

Judicial career

1953: Appointed a Supreme Court judge.
1957: Sat on the court-martial – Criminal Court of Appeals, discussing the problem of "Lawful Orders" in the case of the killing of 48 Arabs in the village Kafr Qasim.
1961: Presided over the Eichmann Trial.
1962: Set a precedent regarding the freedom of information by overruling a censor decision.
1965: As Chairman of the Israeli Central Elections Committee he was the first to disqualify a "subversive" list from running for the Knesset.
1974: Member of the Agranat Commission.
1976: Deputy President of the Supreme Court.
1980: President of Supreme Court until 1982.
1987: Headed the Landau Commission to investigate the Shin Bet's procedures. The commission found frequent cases of perjury in court and violations of the law. The commission acknowledged that "moderate physical pressure" might sometimes be necessary as an interrogation tool. Israeli human rights groups maintained that the practices authorized by the commission amounted to torture. The commission's report was nullified in 1999 by a Supreme Court ruling.

Other positions held

Member of the International Court of Justice. Chairman of the World Zionist Congress tribunal. Chairman of the advisory Commissions on reforming the Israeli Land Law, criminal procedure and administrative tribunals. Chairman of the commission for recognition of righteous among the nations in Yad Vashem. From 1956 to 1962 and from 1965 to 1966 he served as chairman of the board of directors of the Technion.

Awards and honours
Landau received honorary doctorates from the Technion in 1980 and from the Hebrew Union College in 1997.

In 1991, he was awarded the Israel Prize for law. In 1993, he was made an honorary chairman of the Technion's board of directors.

See also
 List of Israel Prize recipients

References

1912 births
2011 deaths
Alumni of the University of London
Chief justices of the Supreme Court of Israel
Israel Prize in law recipients
Jurists from Gdańsk
People from West Prussia
Jewish emigrants from Nazi Germany to Mandatory Palestine
Adolf Eichmann